is a public university in Chūō-ku, Sapporo, Hokkaidō, Japan. The precursor of the school was founded in 1945, and it was chartered as a university in 1950.

History 
The , the precursor of the university, was founded in 1945. The Sapporo Medical University was established in 1950 with the School of Medicine, and the Graduate School of Medicine was also founded in 1956, as part of Hokkaidō's development project.

In 1968, Jurō Wada, one of the pioneers of heart surgery, performed a heart transplant for the first time in Japan, which was later accused of a failure in the Wada Heart Transplant Incident. The Sapporo Medical University Hygiene Junior College was established in 1983, and it was reorganized and incorporated to its current School of Health Science in 1993.

Overview 
The University has a hospital in affiliation, called Sapporo Medical University Hospital, and has performed a number of surgeries including organ transplant. It hosts the Bilomedical Research Center, the Marine Biological Institute, Biomedical Center and Animal Research Center. The university also has some laboratories and institutes which affiliated with Hokkaidō University and Otaru University of Commerce.

Notable alumni
 Hisashi Kazama - a politician
 Junichi Watanabe - a novelist, a winner of Naoki Prize

References

External links 
 

Public universities in Japan
Educational institutions established in 1945
Universities and colleges in Sapporo
1945 establishments in Japan
Medical schools in Japan